Charles Leroux (born as Joseph Johnson; 31 October 1856 in Waterbury, Connecticut, United States –  in Reval, Governorate of Estonia, Russian Empire) was an American balloonist and parachutist.

He died on his 239th jump after a water landing in the city bay of Reval (now Tallinn, Estonia). A monument to Charles Leroux is located on Pirita road near Maarjamäe, Tallinn.

Biography
Charles Leroux was born in the town of Waterbury, Connecticut, United States. He came to Europe in 1889 in order to demonstrate his skill in flying balloons and parachuting from them. He is known to have performed exhibition jumps in Germany (Berlin and Bremen) and Russia (Moscow, St. Petersburg). He was to conclude his European tour in Tallinn.

Leroux's parachute jump in Tallinn, initially scheduled for 10 September was postponed for two days on account of high winds. On 12 September (o.s.), however, the weather showed little improvement. Variable winds were accompanied with fine rain every now and then. After an angry argument with his manager, Leroux decided to go up.

The balloon was inflated with lighting gas supplied by the local gas factory and it took off at 5 PM from a small elevation, a former bastion called Harjumägi in the centre of the town. Winds overpowered the balloon at once and quickly drove it towards the Tallinn Bay. Above the last houses of the town the balloonist dropped himself down from the suspended seat and began to descend under a properly inflated canopy. The winds, however, rocked the parachute violently and carried it farther out to sea. About a mile and quarter away from the coast the heavily oscillating parachute dropped into the sea. Leroux made no attempt to unharness himself from the parachute and almost immediately disappeared under water. Some observers thought that they saw him once or twice to rise to the surface. No safety precautions had been taken, and the lifeboats that reached the area ten minutes later found no trace of the balloonist. Two days passed before Leroux's body was recovered by local people. A medical commission came to the conclusion that he had drowned. 

Charles Leroux was an inventor at heart who did much to improve his balloon and parachute. The performance in Tallinn not only aroused general interest in aviation in Estonia, it also became a kind of milestone for several young men whose dreams and ambitions already moved in the same direction. Estonian sports aviators highly appreciate Leroux for his charismatic role in aeronautics and regard the perpetuation of his memory as a matter of honour.

It is rumoured in Estonia that Leroux was the nephew of Abraham Lincoln, the 16th President of the United States. That is not possible because Lincoln's only sister Sarah Lincoln Grigsby died in 1828 and his only brother Thomas Lincoln Jr. in 1812, when 3 days old.

He was buried at the Kopli cemetery in Tallinn. The cemetery was completely flattened and destroyed by the Soviet occupation authorities in 1950, governing the country at the time.

References

1856 births
1889 deaths
Accidental deaths in Estonia
American balloonists
American skydivers
Aviators killed in aviation accidents or incidents
Burials in Estonia
Deaths by drowning
History of Tallinn
Parachuting deaths
People from Waterbury, Connecticut
Victims of aviation accidents or incidents in 1889
Victims of aviation accidents or incidents in Europe